John Howe (27 December 1868 – 29 July 1939) was an Australian cricketer. He played one first-class match for Tasmania in 1894.

See also
 List of Tasmanian representative cricketers

References

External links
 

1868 births
1939 deaths
Australian cricketers
Tasmania cricketers